Dwi Joko Prihatin (born February 25, 1982 in Sukoharjo Regency) is an Indonesian footballer who currently plays for Persiba Balikpapan in the Indonesia Super League.

Club statistics

References

External links

1982 births
Association football defenders
Living people
Indonesian footballers
Liga 1 (Indonesia) players
Deltras F.C. players
Persiba Balikpapan players
Indonesian Premier Division players
Persita Tangerang players
Persis Solo players
People from Sukoharjo Regency
Sportspeople from Central Java
21st-century Indonesian people